Ishan Davé (born November 7, 1989) is a Canadian actor known for his roles in Kim's Convenience and Degrassi: The Next Generation. His first acting job was as a teenager in the television series Renegadepress.com, for which he was nominated twice for a Gemini Award.

Davé lives in Toronto, Ontario, and is a graduate of the National Theatre School of Canada. He has performed in solo and group theatre shows, and was a member of the NAC English Theatre Ensemble.

Filmography

Film

Television

References

External links

1989 births
Living people
Canadian male film actors